Josef Rovenský (17 April 1894 – 5 November 1937) was a Czech-Jewish film actor and director. He appeared in 74 films between 1914 and 1936. He starred in the 1929 film Father Vojtech, which was the directorial debut of Martin Frič. He died during filming of Virginity. According to Otakar Vávra he died of cocaine overdose. His last film Watchman No. 47 was then completed by Jan Sviták.

Selected filmography

Director

Actor

 Little Red Riding Hood (1920)
 Tu ten kámen (1923)
 White Paradise (1924)
 Schweik in Civilian Life (1927)
 Kainovo znamení (1928)
 Father Vojtech (1929)
 Diary of a Lost Girl (1929)
 The Call of the North (1929)
 The Girl with the Whip (1929)
 Sin of a Beautiful Woman (1929)
 Když struny lkají (1930)
 A Girl from the Reeperbahn (1930)
 The Caviar Princess (1930)
 Imperial and Royal Field Marshal (1930)
 Chudá holka (1930)
 Tonka of the Gallows (1930)
 The Last Bohemian (1931)
 Business Under Distress (1931)
 The Affair of Colonel Redl (1932)
 Sister Angelika (1932)
 The Undertaker (1932)
 Wehe, wenn er losgelassen (1932)
 Public Not Admitted (1933)
 The Inspector General (1933)
 Daughter of the Regiment (1933)

References

External links
 

1894 births
1937 deaths
Male actors from Prague
People from the Kingdom of Bohemia
Czech Jews
Czech male film actors
Czech film directors
Czech male silent film actors
20th-century Czech male actors
Silent film directors
Cocaine-related deaths